Jorge Mautner - O Filho do Holocausto is a 2012 Brazilian documentary film directed by Pedro Bial and Heitor D’Alincourt.

The film follows the birth of Jorge Mautner up to his 17 years. He was born in Brazil shortly after his parents fled the Holocaust. Raised by a nanny who introduced him to Candomblé, Mautner became a precursor of the Tropicália, contributing to the construction of the identity of Brazilian music.

Cast 
 Gilberto Gil
 Caetano Veloso
 Jorge Mautner
 José Roberto Aguilar
 Maria Elisabeth Ildiko De Fiore
 Maria Helena Guimarães
 Nélson Jacobina
 Ottaviano De Fiore
 Ruth Mautner
 Susanne Bial

References

External links
 

Brazilian biographical films
Brazilian documentary films
Documentary films about music and musicians
2012 documentary films
2012 films
Films shot in Rio de Janeiro (city)